Hague Tribunal is a popular name for any of the various international courts located in The Hague, Netherlands:
Permanent Court of Arbitration, a permanent arbitration court established in 1899
Permanent Court of International Justice (1922–1944), superseded by the International Court of Justice
International Court of Justice (since 1945)
International Criminal Tribunal for the former Yugoslavia, an ad hoc criminal tribunal created by the United Nations Security Council  
International Criminal Court, a permanent criminal court created by the Rome Treaty 
International Court of Arbitration of the International Chamber of Commerce